Giovanna Sandri (1923-2002) was an Italian visual poet, associated with the Italian Neo-Avant-Garde movement. Her career started in the 1960s using dry transfer lettering. 

Her work is included in the book Women in Concrete Poetry: 1959-1979 . Her 1969 work Capitolo zero can be found in the Museu d'Art Contemporani de Barcelona. Her artist's books are in the collection of the National Museum of Women in the Arts.

Sandri work was included in the 59th Venice Biennale.

References

1923 births
2002 deaths
Women book artists
Italian women artists
Italian women poets
20th-century Italian women artists
Visual poets